Araski AES, also known as RPK Araski for sponsorship reasons, is a women's basketball team based in Vitoria-Gasteiz, Basque Country, Spain. The team currently plays in league Liga Femenina de Baloncesto.

History

In September 2010, Abaroa and UPV Álava merged for founding the Araski Association with the aim to develop the women's basketball. In May 2016, the team promoted to Liga Femenina.

In its first season in the top tier, Araski qualified for the Copa de la Reina, where it eliminated host team Star Center–Uni Ferrol in the quarterfinals, but did not advance more stages as they were eliminated by Spar CityLift Girona in the semifinals.

Araski ended in the fourth position after reaching the semifinals of the competition. This was the best performance ever for a newcomer in the league.

Sponsorship naming
Araski AES has had several denominations through the years due to its sponsorship:

Home arenas
 Polideportivo Mendizorrotza (2013–present)

Coaches

Season by season

Trophies and awards

Trophies
Liga Femenina 2: (1)
2015–16

References

External links
Official website
Araski AES at FEB.es 

Women's basketball teams in Spain
Basque basketball teams
Liga Femenina de Baloncesto teams
Basketball teams established in 2010
2010 establishments in Spain
Sport in Vitoria-Gasteiz